Thomas O'Connor (December 21, 1815 – October 21, 1901) was an American farmer and politician.

Born in King's County, Ireland, O'Connor emigrated to the United States settling in Pennsylvania and then in Michigan. He worked in a rolling mill. In 1856, he settled in Halder, Wisconsin and was a farmer. O'Connor served on the Emmett Town Board and on the local school board. In 1891, he served in the Wisconsin State Assembly and was a Democrat. He died in Madison, Wisconsin.

Notes

19th-century Irish people
1815 births
1901 deaths
Irish emigrants to the United States (before 1923)
People from Marathon County, Wisconsin
Politicians from County Offaly
Farmers from Wisconsin
Wisconsin city council members
School board members in Wisconsin
Democratic Party members of the Wisconsin State Assembly
19th-century American politicians